The Gomel Regional Committee of the Communist Party of Belarus, commonly referred to as the Gomel CPB Obkom, was the highest authority in the Gomel Region of the Byelorussian SSR in the Soviet Union. The position was created on January 15, 1938, and abolished on 25 August 1991. The First Secretary was considered the de facto governor of the Minsk region. The First Secretary was appointed by the Politburo.

First Secretaries

Sources 

Communism in Belarus
Gomel Region
1938 establishments in the Soviet Union
1991 disestablishments in the Soviet Union